A photography or paint triplet is set of three photos or paints usually related to one event or developing a theme or story. Many art photographers use triplets to describe more complicated story or to attract the viewer by showing related prints together. Some art critics like triplets because the best photographers are able to describe as complicated story as in simple documentary movie. Some triplets (called clone triplets) are the same image repeated with slight alterations (for example toned to different colors, or mixed color and monochromatic photos) or, more rarely, seemingly identical images with minor, detailed changes.

Triplets are usually framed together or, in galleries, mounted near each other on the wall. Triplets are very often used on postcards.

When four photos or paints are together, it is called photography quadruplet. Multiple images chained together are called photography fold.

Ordering and time line
Images are usually located from left to right with oldest (in terms of story) on left and newest on right side. For vertical triplet, older image is usually on the top and more recent on bottom. When photos are not related in time, then they are arranged to be most pleasant to viewer's eye (such as dark to bright) or using some logical arrangements.

See also
 Triptych three-panel artwork

Photographic techniques